Plaza Nueva (New Square) may refer to:
Plaza Nueva, Bilbao
Plaza Nueva, Seville
Plaza Nueva, Toledo
Plaza Nueva, Vitoria